Boretto is a comune (municipality) in the Province of Reggio Emilia in the Italian region Emilia-Romagna, located about  northwest of Bologna and about  northwest of Reggio Emilia..

Boretto borders the following municipalities: Brescello, Castelnovo di Sotto, Gualtieri, Pomponesco, Poviglio, Viadana.

Among the churches is the Basilica Minore of San Marco and Santa Croce.

External links
Official website

References

Cities and towns in Emilia-Romagna